Hausach is a town in the Ortenaukreis, in western Baden-Württemberg, Germany.

History
Hausach was founded in the 13th century, below Husen Castle. In the 14th century, it became a possession of the County of Fürstenberg, who gave the town its charter and maintained a residence in it. In 1806, Hausach was mediatized to the Grand Duchy of Baden. The town was assigned in 1813 to the district of Haslach, but in 1857 was reassigned to the district of Wolfach. On 1 Jul 1971, the town of Einbach was incorporated into Hausach.

Geography 
The township (Stadt) of Hausach is part of the Ortenau district of Baden-Württemberg, in the Federal Republic of Germany. It is physically located in the Central Black Forest, at the center of the valley of the Kinzig. the elevation above sea level in the municipal area ranges from a high of  Normalnull (NN) at the Brandenkopf to a low of  NN along the Kinzig.

Politics 
Hausach has two boroughs (Stadtteile): Hausach and Einbach.

The town council has 18 seats. The last election on May 25, 2014, gave the Free Voters as well as the Christian Democratic Union six of them. The Social Democratic Party took four seats, and the Greens two.

Hausach twinned with Arbois, France in 1974. The 45th anniversary of that twinning was celebrated by a visit of 37 German functionaries to Arbois on 15 October 2019.

Coat of Arms 
Hausach's coat of arms displays half-timber framework of a gable in red on a field of white. The oldest town seals used in Hausach, dating back to 1453, used a house of timber, then stone, and then from 1655 of a half-timber design. This last symbol became the one permanently associated with Hausach by 1771.

Transportation

References

External links

  

Ortenaukreis